Verkhny Yenangsk is a rural locality (a selo) in Kichmengskoye Rural Settlement, Kichmengsko-Gorodetsky District, Vologda Oblast, Russia. The population was 15 as of 2002.

Geography 
Verkhny Yenangsk is located 56 km southeast of Kichmengsky Gorodok (the district's administrative centre) by road. Mitino is the nearest rural locality.

References 

Rural localities in Kichmengsko-Gorodetsky District